Wyoming is a historic home located near Studley in King William County, Virginia.  It was built about 1800, and is a two-story, five bay, Georgian style frame dwelling. It has a single-pile, central hall plan and is set on a brick foundation. The house is topped by a clipped gable roof with a standing-seam sheet metal surface and modillion cornice.  It measures 55 feet long and 25 feet deep.

It was listed on the National Register of Historic Places in 1980.

References

Houses on the National Register of Historic Places in Virginia
Georgian architecture in Virginia
Houses completed in 1800
Houses in King William County, Virginia
National Register of Historic Places in King William County, Virginia